Stejneger's worm lizard (Amphisbaena stejnegeri) is a species of amphisbaenian in the family Amphisbaenidae. The species is endemic to Guyana.

Etymology
The specific name, stejnegeri, is in honor of Norwegian-born American herpetologist Leonhard Stejneger.

Habitat
The preferred habitat of A. stejnegeri is forest.

Reproduction
A. stejnegeri is oviparous.

References

Further reading
Gans C (1963). "Notes on Amphisbaenids (Amphisbaenia, Reptilia). 8. A Redescription of Amphisbaena stejnegeri and the Description of a New Species of Amphisbaena from British Guiana". American Museum Novitates (2128): 1–18. (Amphisbaena stejnegeri, pp. 3–13, Figures 2–9). 
Gans C (2005). "Checklist and Bibliography of the Amphisbaenia of the World". Bulletin of the American Museum of Natural History (289): 1–130. (Amphisbaena stejnegeri, p. 20).
Ruthven AG (1922). "A New Species of Amphisbaena from British Guiana". Occasional Papers of the Museum of Zoology, University of Michigan (122): 1–2. (Amphisbaena stejnegeri, new species).
Vanzolini PE (2002). "An aid to the identification of the South American species of Amphisbaena (Squamata, Amphisbaenidae)". Papéis Avulsos de Zoologia, Museu de Zoologia da Universidade de São Paulo 42 (15): 351–362.

Amphisbaena (lizard)
Reptiles described in 1922
Taxa named by Alexander Grant Ruthven
Endemic fauna of Guyana
Reptiles of Guyana